This timeline of the history of Toronto documents all events that occurred in Toronto, Ontario, Canada, including historical events in the former cities of East York, Etobicoke, North York, Toronto, Scarborough, and York. Events date back to the early-17th century and continue until the present in chronological order. The timeline also includes events taken place in municipalities bordering Toronto.

In this timeline, the name Toronto refers to Old Toronto in events listed before 1998.


Pre-founding of Toronto

19th century

20th century

21st century

List of years in Canada

References

History of Toronto
Timelines of cities in Canada
Ontario history timelines